Stanisław Maria Jan Teofil Szeptycki (3 November 1867 – 9 October 1950) was a Polish count, general and military commander.

Biography
Born in 1867 in Galicia, Austria-Hungary to the aristocratic Szeptycki family, he was the grandson of Polish playwright Aleksander Fredro, son of the count Jan Kanty Szeptycki and brother of Andrey Sheptytsky, Metropolitan Archbishop of the Ukrainian Greek Catholic Church.

Szeptycki joined the Austro-Hungarian Army, where he attained the rank of colonel. In 1914 he joined the Polish Legions, where he became commander of the Third Brigade, and from November 1916 to April 1917 commander of the entire Polish Legions formation. Following the Oath Crisis he commanded the German-aligned Polnische Wehrmacht. Until February 1918 he was Austro-Hungarian governor general of Lublin, but resigned in protest when Germany turned Chełm and the surrounding area over to the Ukrainians. He joined the newly recreated Polish Armed Forces in November 1918 following the country's independence and replaced General Tadeusz Rozwadowski as Chief of the General Staff, a post that he held until March 1919.

During the Polish-Soviet War of 1919–1921, Szeptycki commanded the Polish Northeast Front and the 4th Army. In 1919 he commanded Operation Minsk. He disagreed with the Polish Commander-in-Chief, Józef Piłsudski, which cost him his post, and joined the National Democratic opposition to Piłsudski. From June to December 1923 he was Minister of Military Affairs; during that time he challenged Piłsudski to a duel for a perceived slight (Piłsudski refused the challenge).

After Piłsudski's May 1926 Coup d'État, Szeptycki was dismissed from active service. After World War II, from 1945 to 1950, he headed the Polish Red Cross (Polski Czerwony Krzyż).

He died in Korczyna in 1950.

Honours and awards
 Commander's Cross of the Virtuti Militari, also awarded the Silver Cross
 Commander's Cross with Star of the Order of Polonia Restituta
 Cross of Valour - four times
 Cross of Liberty, class II (Estonia)
 Order of Lāčplēsis, 2nd class (Latvia)

Further reading 

 Andrzej Wojtaszak, General Broni Stanislaw Szeptycki (1867-1950) (University of Szczecin 2000)

References

1867 births
1950 deaths
People from Lviv Oblast
People from the Kingdom of Galicia and Lodomeria
Stanisław
Polish Austro-Hungarians
Counts of Poland
Austro-Hungarian generals
Polish generals in other armies
Polish People's Army generals
Polish legionnaires (World War I)
Polnische Wehrmacht personnel
Polish people of the Polish–Soviet War
People of the Polish May Coup (pro-government side)
Commanders of the Virtuti Militari
Commanders with Star of the Order of Polonia Restituta
Recipients of the Cross of Valour (Poland)
Recipients of the Order of Lāčplēsis, 2nd class